The 1988 National Challenge Cup was the 75th edition of the national soccer championship of the United States.

Regional semifinals

Region I
April 24 Spartans SC (DC/VA)	3:2	Philadelphia Inter (East PA)
May 1	NY Pancyprian Freedoms (East NY)	2:1	Hellenic SC (MA)

Region II
Date ?	St. Louis Busch SC (MO)	W:L	Madison 56ers (WI)
Date ?	Udinese SC (MO)	W:L	Ayulta (IL)

Region III  
Date ?	Dallas Mean Green (North TX)	W:L	Galveston International (South TX)
Date ?	Soccer City (GA)	W:L	??

Region IV  
May 21	Greek-American A.C. (North CA)	W:L	Fresno International (North CA)
Date ?	King Taco (South CA)	W:L	??

Regional finals
Result

Region I
Date ?	NY Pancyprian Freedoms (East NY)	3:0	Spartans SC (DC/VA)

Region II
Date ?	St. Louis Busch SC (MO)	4:0	Udinese SC (MO)

Region III
Date ?	Dallas Mean Green (North TX)	2:0	Soccer City (GA)

Region IV
Date ?	Greek-American A.C. (North CA)	1:0	King Taco (South CA)

National semifinals
(St. Louis Soccer Park – Fenton, Mo.)	
June 10	St. Louis Busch SC (MO)	2:0	Dallas Mean Green (North TX)
June 10	Greek-American A.C. (North CA)	3:2	NY Pancyprian Freedoms (East NY)

Final
St. Louis Soccer Park – Fenton, Mo. 	 
June 25	St. Louis Busch SC (MO)	2:1 (AET) Greek-American A.C. (North CA)

References
 

Cup
U.S. Open Cup